Boxing at the 2014 Summer Youth Olympics was held from 23 to 27 August 2014 at the Nanjing International Expo Center in Nanjing, China. For the first time three female boxing events took place at the Youth Olympics.

Qualification
Each National Olympic Committee (NOC) can enter a maximum of 5 competitors, 3 males and 2 females with a maximum of 1 competitor in each weight category. 62 places were decided at the 2014 AIBA Youth World Championships held in Sofia, Bulgaria from 14–24 April 2014. The top 5 male and top 4 female boxers of each weight category qualified to the Youth Olympics. As hosts, China was given two quotas, 1 per each gender to compete. Initially 14 quotas, 9 males and 5 females were given to the Tripartite Commission, however the spots were not allocated due to lack of technical abilities and safety concerns thus the quotas were reallocated based on the results from the 2014 AIBA Youth World Championships.

To be eligible to participate at the Youth Olympics athletes must have been born between 1 January 1996 and 31 December 1997. Furthermore, all athletes must have participated at the 2014 AIBA Youth World Championships.

Schedule

The schedule was released by the Nanjing Youth Olympic Games Organizing Committee. Three sessions will be held per day during the preliminary, semifinals and ranking rounds.

All times are CST (UTC+8)

Medal summary

Medal table

Boys' events

Girls' events

References

External links
Official Results Book – Boxing

 
2014 Summer Youth Olympics events
Youth Summer Olympics
International boxing competitions hosted by China
2014